Louis of Blois can refer to:

 Louis I, Count of Blois (1172–1205), Count of Blois and participant in the Fourth Crusade
 Louis II, Count of Blois (died 1346), Count of Blois and lord of Avesnes
 Louis III, Count of Blois (died 1372), Count of Blois and lord of Avesnes
 Louis de Blois (1506–1566), French mystical writer